CGG SA (CGG) is a multinational geoscience technology services company that specializes on solving complex natural resource, environmental and infrastructure challenges.

CGG is listed on Euronext Paris, and was listed on the New York Stock Exchange until October 1, 2018.

History
In 1926, Conrad Schlumberger, and his brother Marcel Schlumberger, formed Société de Prospection Electrique (SPE) which specialized in oil and coal exploration as well as civil engineering.

In March 1931, SPE and Société Géophysique de Recherches Minières (SGRM), both specialists in seismology and magnetometry, merged into La Compagnie Générale de Géophysique (CGG). SGRM provided 5,000,000 francs of capital and CGG capital of 120,000 francs. In his premises at 30 rue Fabert, in Paris, Conrad Schlumberger decided to transfer the subsurface business to CGG while SPE retained the logging. At the same time, Raymond Maillet from SGRM was appointed President of CGG.

The first two years of business for CGG were shaky. Near-surface surveys (hydrology, mining and civil engineering) and oil exploration were not enough to break even in a period when oil was worth 10 cents a barrel. In 1966, CGG opened its first seismic data processing center in Massy, France.

Veritas DGC
Veritas Energy Services, a geophysical services company, was established in 1974 in Calgary, Alberta, Canada with the purchase of a Rafael Cruz owned firm Rafael B. Cruz and Associates Ltd. by David B. Robson.

Meanwhile, Digital Consultants Inc. had been established in Houston, Texas in 1965.  In 1969, Digital Consultants reincorporated as Digicon Inc. (DGC), becoming a public company on the American Stock Exchange.
 
In 1996, Veritas DGC was formed from the merger of Veritas and Digicon.

CGGVeritas
The company became CGGVeritas through its merger with the North American company Veritas in 2007.

CGGVeritas acquired Norwegian company Wavefield Inseis in December 2008.

CGG
In September 2012, CGGVeritas acquired Fugro's Geoscience Division for €1.2 billion, and changed back its name to CGG

In 2020, the group's net loss reached $442m due to oil crisis which followed the COVID-19 pandemic, compared to $69m in 2019, while turnover fell 35% to $886m. For 2021, CGG expected more optimistic outcome due to vaccination and the rebound in oil prices.

Operations

Natural Resources 
CGG develops geoscience technology to find natural resources and manage those resources sustainably. The organization focuses on the development process of oil & gas, the lifecycle of minerals & mining, and  the monitoring and evaluation of geothermal developments.

Minerals and Mining: CGG supports mineral exploration through global geological predictions and plate kinematic studies,  satellite-derived surface material alteration targeting, provision of geophysical equipment, and the development and provision of modeling software.

Geothermal: CGG evaluates and monitors geothermal developments to gain insight across asset life cycle by utilizing data & analytics, resource assessments,  reservoir characterization, and production & monitoring.

Environmental 
CGG utilizes analytics and earth monitoring to understand human impact on environment. CGG focuses on critical environmental insight (on land, ocean, or atmosphere) through remote sensing, machine learning analytics, data analysis & interpretation, and high performance computing (HPC).

Some of the environmental projects in which CGG has worked on include conducting microplastics pollution surveys as part of study for an effort to create a Plastic Free zone at Yr Wydffa (Snowdon).

Infrastructure 
CGG utilizes monitoring technology to understand infrastructure's life span, conditions, and need of enhancements. CGG's Sercel Structural Monitoring solutions detect potential issues early on to provide structure integrity and public safety.

One of the known applications of CGG's infrastructure monitoring technology is in its work on the "Connected Bridges" project for the French public body. CGG contributed to implementation of autonomous sensors and cloud based signal processing.

Energy Transition 
CGG is focused on monitoring of geothermal developments, carbon capture/ utilization and storage, and management of minerals to find solutions to reach a sustainable and zero-carbon future. CGG intelligence evaluates and monitors geothermal developments across asset life. CGG has capabilities on screening, evaluating, and monitoring of sub-surface risks to speed up development and minimize risk. Additionally, CGG works on responsible management of minerals for energy transition.

Digital 
CGG has digital capabilities in data management, data transformation,  machine learning, and cloud services.

Organization

Equipment
CGG's Equipment business, Sercel, offers systems, sensors and sources for seismic acquisition and downhole monitoring. Oilfield service companies and geophysical contractors use the equipment for monitoring subsurface characteristics on onshore, offshore, downhole and seabed activities.

Acquisition
CGG has had data acquisition capabilities to conduct geophysical surveys, both on the ground (Land division) and at sea (Marine division).

In a move to focus on geophysical services, it got rid of those divisions, ending in 2019 by the sale of its last vessels to Shearwater Geoservices.

Geology, Geophysics & Reservoir (GGR)
The Geology, Geophysics & Reservoir Division provides seismic and geophysical services for  characterizing the subsurface, and monitoring hydrocarbon reservoirs. Services include Land 
and Marine Seismic Acquisition, Geophysical Processing and Imaging, and Reservoir Characterization.

References

Engineering companies of France
Oilfield services companies
Construction and civil engineering companies established in 1931
Non-renewable resource companies established in 1931
French companies established in 1931
Seismological observatories, organisations and projects
Companies based in Paris
Companies listed on Euronext Paris